The Italian Mountain Running Championships are the national championships in mountain running, organised every year by the FIDAL from 1976 (men) and 1980 (women).

Description
Usually the national championship is divided into three races, one only climbing the mountain, one uphill and downhill and a chronoscale (not necessarily in this order), but from 2014 there are only two races. The Italian champion is determined by the points ranking of these three races.

Editions and winners

See also
 Italian Long Distance Mountain Running Championships

References

External links
FIDAL web site

Mountain running competitions
Mountain
Athletics competitions in Italy
National athletics competitions
Recurring sporting events established in 1976